Isaac Swayze (1751 – February 11, 1828) was a soldier and political figure in Upper Canada.

He was born in Morris County, New Jersey in 1751 into a family of German immigrants. During the American Revolution, according to legend, he served as a secret agent for the British, was arrested, sentenced to death and escaped by exchanging clothes with his wife during a prison visit. In 1783, he was arrested by the British authorities at New York, having been suspected of committed a robbery, and later released, on condition that he leave town.

In 1784, he settled at St. Davids on the Niagara peninsula. He is famous for being the pioneer nurseryman of the Niagara District, having carried trees on his back from New York State to his new homestead at Beaverdams. Swayze created the apple known as the Swayze Pomme Gris.

In 1792, he was elected to the 1st Parliament of Upper Canada representing the 3rd riding of Lincoln. In 1795, he led a protest against the wording used on deeds that some people believed would prevent the sale of their own land. He was charged with sedition and fined. He was elected again in Lincoln County in 1800 after a campaign where he was accused of being a horse thief by his competitors, including Silvester Tiffany, who published his accusations in his newspaper, the Niagara Herald. At this time, Swayze generally supported policies favouring the common folk rather than the rich elite.

He was elected again in 1804 and 1816. He was a captain of troops during the War of 1812. His house and barn were destroyed during the conflict. He was a  vocal opponent of the reformer Robert Gourlay and helped bring charges of seditious libel against Bartemas Ferguson, then editor of the Niagara Spectator, for publishing an article written by Gourlay.

He died near Niagara (Niagara-on-the-Lake) in 1828.

External links 
Biography at the Dictionary of Canadian Biography Online

1751 births
1828 deaths
Members of the Legislative Assembly of Upper Canada
People from Niagara-on-the-Lake
People from Morris County, New Jersey